Philip Francis Nowlan (November 13, 1888 – February 1, 1940) was an American science fiction writer, best known as the creator of Buck Rogers.

Biography
Nowlan was born on November 13, 1888. While attending the University of Pennsylvania, Nowlan was a member of The Mask and Wig Club, holding significant roles in the annual productions between 1907 and 1909. After attending the University of Pennsylvania he worked as a newspaper columnist. Nowlan was married to Theresa Junker, and they had ten children.

He moved to the Philadelphia suburb of Bala Cynwyd and created and wrote the Buck Rogers comic strip, illustrated by Dick Calkins. He remained a writer on the strip until 1939. The comic strip ran from 1929-1967. Spin-offs included a radio-serial series Buck Rogers in the 25th Century (sporadically aired from 1932-1947), a 1939 movie serial Buck Rogers, a brief 1950-51 television series, and a 1979-1981 television series Buck Rogers in the 25th Century.

Nowlan also wrote several other novellas for the science fiction magazines as well as the posthumously published mystery, The Girl from Nowhere. He died from a stroke at his home in Bala in 1940.

Works
 Armageddon 2419 A.D. (1928)
 The Girl from Nowhere (1928,  (Neuauflage von 2005)
 The Airlords of Han (1929) on Project Gutenberg
 The Onslaught from Venus (1929)
 The Time Jumpers (1934)
 The Prince of Mars Returns (1940)
 Space Guards (1940)
 Wings Over Tomorrow: The Collected Science Fiction of Philip Francis Nowlan (2005)

See also
 List of Buck Rogers comic strips
 Buck Rogers: A Life in the Future
 Buck Rogers XXVC (TSR game series)

References

External links
 
 
 
 
 
 

1888 births
1940 deaths
20th-century American male writers
20th-century American novelists
American male novelists
American science fiction writers
University of Pennsylvania alumni
Writers from Philadelphia
Buck Rogers